Lovefilm is a 1970 Hungarian drama film written and directed by István Szabó. The film was selected as the Hungarian entry for the Best Foreign Language Film at the 43rd Academy Awards, but was not accepted as a nominee.

Lovefilm is a film that is a cinematic imagery of the unspoken and untold aspects of love and hope between individuals. It depicts love between two childhood sweet hearts who continue to share strong bond and friendship through their adulthood though they quite do not define it as a love relationship for most part. They continue to refer to their relation as friends or childhood friendship or even introduce each other to their friends as 'like my brother' and 'like my sister'. It thus depicts love and undefined relationships that is experienced by most humans in their lives. Hence the musical and lucid title of 'Serelmesfilm' or 'Lovefilm'.

Non linear imagery
Picturizing the undefined and unspoken nature of love between individuals that exists mostly in the minds of people, the film editing and flow is non linear and has constant transitions back and forth between images of childhood memories during World War II Nazi occupied Hungary and the Soviet communist party controlled 1950s schooling and the early 1960s university days. It also echoes the tense times of 1956 and the feeling of nostalgia in the early 1970s. This gives the motion picture subject of love as an experience as largely in one's mind and mostly non linguistic and unspoken and expressed in silence and through the passage of time and experiences.

Cast
 András Bálint as Jancsi
 Judit Halász as Kata
 Edit Kelemen as younger Kata
 András Szamosfalvi as younger Jancsi
 Flóra Kádár

See also
 List of submissions to the 43rd Academy Awards for Best Foreign Language Film
 List of Hungarian submissions for the Academy Award for Best Foreign Language Film

References

External links 
 

1970 films
1970 drama films
1970s Hungarian-language films
Films directed by István Szabó
Hungarian drama films